Tinos is a town on the island of Tinos, in the Cyclades, Greece. It is also locally known as Chora (Χώρα) as is common in the Cyclades for island principal towns.

Tinos Town is the site of the Church of Panagia Evangelistria, a site of pilgrimage for Greeks and the town has many businesses that revolve around pilgrims' needs.

Since the 2011 local government reform it is part of the municipality Tinos, of which it is the seat and a municipal unit. The municipal unit has an area of 22.873 km2. Its population was 5,744 inhabitants at the 2011 census. It shares the island of Tinos with the municipal units of Exomvourgo and Panormos.

Tinos is the largest town on the island and has been the administrative capital since the destruction of the former town and fortress of Tinos on the mountain Exobourgo. The current town was formerly known as San Nicolò.

Historical population

References

Mediterranean port cities and towns in Greece
Port cities of the Aegean Sea